Thaiattus is a monotypic genus of southeast Asian jumping spiders containing the single species, Thaiattus krabi. It was first described by Dmitri V. Logunov in 2020, and it has only been found in Thailand.

See also
 List of Salticidae genera

References

Monotypic Salticidae genera
Arthropods of Thailand